Mexitlia is a genus of North American cribellate araneomorph spiders in the family Dictynidae, and was first described by Pekka T. Lehtinen in 1967.  it contains only three species: M. altima, M. grandis, and M. trivittata.

References

External links

Araneomorphae genera
Dictynidae
Spiders of Mexico
Spiders of the United States
Taxa named by Pekka T. Lehtinen